Starbreaker is a fictional character that appears in comic books published by DC Comics. The character first appeared in Justice League of America #96 (February 1972), and was created by Mike Friedrich and Dick Dillin.

Publication history
Starbreaker debuted in a three-part storyline that ran in Justice League of America #96-98 (February-May 1972). The first chapter, "The Coming of Starbreaker" introduced the foe; the second, "The Day the Earth Screams", featured the origin story of the Justice League and the final chapter "No More Tomorrows", featured Sargon the Sorcerer, who aids the League in defeating the villain. The character did not appear in DC Comics continuity again until featured in a four-part storyline in Justice League America #62-65 (May-August 1992). Starbreaker eventually returned, revealed to be the mastermind behind a planet abduction in Adam Strange (vol. 2) #1-8 (November 2004-June 2005) before a reappearance in Justice League of America (vol. 2) #29-34 (March-August 2009).

Fictional character biography
Three members of the Justice League of America - Flash; Green Lantern and Hawkman - are diverted from a return trip to Earth by their ally and resident of the planet Rann, Adam Strange. Tracing a faint power ring transmission from Green Lantern, Superman joins the heroes on Rann. Strange has enlisted their aid to defeat an energy vampire called Starbreaker, who is intent on destroying Rann and consuming the planetary energy. Although Starbreaker splits into three copies that begin the process, the villain is defeated by Adam Strange and the Justice Leaguers. Intent on vengeance, Starbreaker attacks Earth, initially defeating Superman, Green Lantern and the Flash. The entire Justice League gathers, and after being spurred on by Hawkman, defeat Starbreaker with the aid of Sargon the Sorcerer. The villain is then incarcerated by the Guardians of the Universe.

Starbreaker eventually escapes, and conquers the planet Almerac, intent on devouring its energies. Another version of the Justice League oppose Starbreaker, with member Blue Beetle manipulating the armour of teammate Booster Gold, using it to absorb the energy from which the villain is composed.

A death-cultist called Sh'ri Valkyr from the planet Thanagar slowly resuscitates Starbreaker, feeding the villain victims and thereby allowing him to regain a corporeal form. Valkyr plans to use Rann's teleportation technology - the Zeta-Beam - to convert the entire universe into energy to feed Starbreaker, who would rule a new universe. With the help of allies the Omega Men and interplanetary peace-keepers L.E.G.I.O.N., Adam Strange strands Starbreaker in an empty universe devoid of energy. Before being killed, Valkyr retaliates by teleporting Rann to Polaris, home system of the planet Thanagar, beginning the Rann-Thanagar War.

An incorporeal Starbreaker returns, intent on destroying his primary foes, the Justice League of America. Starbreaker uses the villain the Shadow Thief as a pawn, and locates an entity possessing enough energy to sustain his form for many years. Revealed to be the adult form of a Sun Eater, Starbreaker engages the League in combat and is weakened by Doctor Light and Firestorm, before being shot in the head with an exotic weapon by Paladin (alternative version of Batman). Although Starbreaker's form dissolves, the League acknowledge the defeat is temporary and that the entity will reform.

Powers and abilities
The character is initially presented as a humanoid "energy vampire" with exceptional strength and durability; and capable of flight, energy projection and creating illusions. Starbreaker can also be empowered by draining negative emotions such as hatred and fear from other beings. The entity is eventually revealed to be a mature version of a "Sun Eater" that requires large amounts of energy to survive, typically draining the energy required from entire stars and then being capable of creating a humanoid form. As an energy entity, however, Starbreaker is susceptible to any device capable of draining energy, which will disperse the humanoid form.

References

External links
 Starbreaker at the DCU Guide
 Cosmic Teams: Adam Strange

Characters created by Dick Dillin
Characters created by Mike Friedrich
Comics characters introduced in 1972
DC Comics aliens
DC Comics characters with superhuman strength
DC Comics extraterrestrial supervillains
DC Comics supervillains